Banda Ramudu is a 1959 Indian Telugu-language film directed by P. Pullayya. The film stars N. T. Rama Rao and Savitri, with music composed by Susarla Dakshinamurthi and N. D. V. Prasada Rao. It was produced by D. B. Narayana and S. Bhavanarayana under the Sahini Art Productions banner. It was released on 6 November 1959.

Plot
Once upon on a time in a kingdom, there was a thief Banda Ramudu (N. T. Rama Rao). People go to the King (Relangi) and plead him to save them from these thieves. The King advises that illiteracy is the main cause for promoting theft, so, he orders people to educate themselves. Gauri (Savitri), daughter of late soldier Singanna lives by selling flowers. She goes to the King and tells him that people also have to work for their livelihood, The King agrees to that. Mahamantri's (Rajanala) eye falls on Gauri, he calls her on the pretext of facilitating her and tries to molest her. Gauri teaches him a lesson and escapes. Banda Ramudu daily meets Gauri at her shop and they love each other. Mahamantri again captures Gauri and her mother Subhadramma (Hemalatha) goes to King and pleads with him to save Gauri. King calls Satyananda Swamy (Nagayya) to solve these issues. On that night, Banda Ramudu tries burglary in a merchant's house and soldiers chase him. Banda Ramudu escapes by joining the group who are carrying Swamy's chariot and listening to his preaching in the court. Swamy tells them that to end corruption, everybody should leave at least one of their bad habits and shows Banda Ramudu as an example that he may be a thief, but he has to leave at least one of his bad habits. Banda Ramudu is afraid that Swamy is going to hand over him to the King. So, he decides to kill Swamy. When he is waiting near the temple to kill Swamy, suddenly one snake turns around his hand, and with the blessings of Swamy, he is saved. Bandaramudu falls on Swamy's feet and promises him that he will never tell a lie. Swamy cautions him that he should not break the promise at any cost.
	
After that, Banda Ramudu rescues Gauri from Mahamantri, takes her to the house, and tells Gauri's mother that he is a thief. Meanwhile, soldiers arrest him. Gauri requests and tells them that Banda Ramudu is not a thief, but he did not agree. Soldiers arrest Gauri also and her mother dies. They keep Banda Ramudu in prison and take Gauri to Mahamantri, when she plays a trick by trapping Mahamantri, she gets the Royal Assent and releases Banda Ramudu. Both of them go to Swamy and tell him that he had many problems because of telling the truth. Swamy convinces him and tells him that he has to face the difficulties with courage. Now Banda Ramudu is in search of a job, but he could not achieve it because he is telling truth to everyone that he was a thief previously. Meanwhile, the King wants to know the facts about the thieves, he travels in disguise like a blind man in the city. Now Banda Ramudu wants to do the last theft. On the way, he meets the King in disguise and says to him that he wants to burgle the king's treasure. The King shows him the way to the treasure and he is observing him. When Banda Ramudu opens the locker, out of four precious gems, he takes only three. Both of them reach their place where the King hears about the atrocities of Mahamantri through Gauri. He feels sad, goes back to the palace and he notices Mahamantri stealing the fourth gem. The King again changes his attire as a madman and tells Mahamantri about Banda Ramudu. Meanwhile, Gauri changes the mind of Banda Ramudu and he promises that he would never do a robbery. At the same time, the King as a blind man comes there and Banda Ramudu gives him back all the three gems. Meanwhile, soldiers sent by Mahamantri attack and arrest all. Mahamantri blames for stealing the fourth gem also on Banda Ramudu and if he fails to return that, he will be hanged by the next morning. Mahamantri tries to molest Gauri and the King obstructs his way, but Mahamantri captures him and keeps him underground. At last, Banda Ramudu escapes from prison protects the King and Gauri, sees the end of Mahamantri, and marries Gauri.

Cast
N. T. Rama Rao as Banda Ramudu
Savitri as Gouri
Nagayya
Rajanala
Relangi
Ramana Reddy
Peketi Sivaram
Chadalavada
Balakrishna
Suryakantham
Hemalatha
Tilakam

Music 
Music was composed by Susarla Dakshinamurthi and K Prasada Rao. Music was released by H. M. V. Audio Company.

References

External links
 

Films based on Indian folklore
Films scored by Susarla Dakshinamurthi
1950s Telugu-language films